The 2023 FIFA Beach Soccer World Cup will be the 12th edition of the FIFA Beach Soccer World Cup, the premier international beach soccer championship contested by men's national teams of the member associations of FIFA. Overall, this will be the 22nd edition of a world cup in beach soccer since the establishment of the Beach Soccer World Championships which ran from 1995 to 2004 but was not governed by FIFA. This will be the seventh tournament to take place biennially; the World Cup took place annually until 2009, which was held in Dubai.

The tournament was first intimated in November 2017 at the FIFA Beach Soccer Workshop when it was announced that the World Cup would continue to be held every two years for the period 2018–2024. The bidding process was opened by FIFA in October 2021 and concluded with the selection of the United Arab Emirates as the hosts in December 2022.

Russia are the defending champions, however all Russian national teams are currently banned indefinitely from competing in FIFA competitions.

Host selection
The original bidding schedule to determine the hosts was as follows:

6 October 2021 – FIFA opens the bidding process.
29 October 2021 – Deadline for national associations to declare interest of hosting to FIFA.
1 November 2021 – FIFA circulates documents detailing the application campaign and conditions of participation to the bidding associations to analyse.
26 November 2021 – Deadline for associations to reaffirm their bidding intentions by agreeing to the terms of the documents.
30 January 2022 – Deadline for nations to prepare and submit their complete bidding packages to be evaluated by FIFA.
31 March 2022 – Hosts announced by FIFA.

On 8 December 2021, FIFA revealed that five associations had affirmed their bidding intentions:

 (Bahrain Football Association)
 (Colombian Football Federation)
 (Seychelles Football Federation)
 (Football Association of Thailand)
 (United Arab Emirates Football Association)

On 14 February 2022, FIFA announced that three of the five associations had submitted bids through to the final stage of the process, with Colombia and Thailand withdrawing.

Confirmation of the awarding of hosting rights was due to be announced at the FIFA Council meeting in Doha, Qatar on 31 March 2022. However, no announcement was made; it was then due to be awarded at its meeting in Auckland, New Zealand on 22 October 2022, but it was announced at the meeting that the decision had been deferred again until a subsequent Council meeting. The United Arab Emirates was awarded the hosting rights to the 2023 tournament, while Seychelles was awarded for the 2025 edition on 16 December 2022.

Qualification
A total of 16 teams will qualify for the final tournament. In addition to the United Arab Emirates who qualifies automatically as the host country, 15 other teams will qualify from six separate continental competitions. The slot allocation was approved by the FIFA Council on 14 March 2023.

The process of qualification to the World Cup finals will begin in 2022 and end in 2023. 

Note: The appearance statistics below refer only to the FIFA era of world cups in beach soccer (since 2005); see this article for the inclusion of World Championships era stats (1995–2004).

Group stage
In the group stage, if a match is level at the end of normal playing time, extra time shall be played (one period of three minutes) and followed, if necessary, by kicks from the penalty mark to determine the winner. Each team earns three points for a win in regulation time, two points for a win in extra time, one point for a win in a penalty shoot-out, and no points for a defeat. The top two teams of each group advance to the quarter-finals.

Tiebreakers
The rankings of teams in each group are determined as follows:

If two or more teams are equal on the basis of the above three criteria, their rankings are determined as follows:

All times are local, GST (UTC+4).

Group A

Group B

Group C

Group D

References

External links
, at FIFA.com
Beach Soccer Worldwide, official website

 
2023
Fifa Beach Soccer World Cup
International association football competitions hosted by the United Arab Emirates
Scheduled association football competitions
November 2023 sports events in Asia
December 2023 sports events in Asia